Robert Kenneth Kuberski, Jr. (born April 5, 1971 in Chester, Pennsylvania) is a former American football defensive tackle in the National Football League for the Green Bay Packers and the New England Patriots.

Biography
Kuberski graduated from Ridley High School in 1989, played college football at the United States Naval Academy (Navy) and was a three-year letter winner and a two-time all-East selection.

Kuberski was drafted by the Packers in the seventh round (183rd overall) of the 1993 NFL Draft. He served on active duty as an Ensign in the United States Navy for two years prior to the beginning of his NFL career.  

He played in Green Bay for four seasons from 1995-1998, seeing action in forty-nine games in which he also served as Green Bay's representative to the NFL Players Association for 1996-98. In 1999, he signed with the New England Patriots, closed out his career playing in five games. Kuberski had two career sacks.

In 2009, he was selected to the Navy Marine Corps Memorial All-Stadium Defensive Line. A member of the Navy Sports Hall of Fame, he was inducted into the Pennsylvania Sports Hall of Fame in 2016. He remains active in the Naval Academy community via his involvement as a Trustee of the United States Naval Academy Foundation and serves as President of the Class of 1993.

Kuberski got his start in financial services as an off-season intern at Associated Investments, following his rookie year in Green Bay, Wisconsin. He then spent ten years as a regional vice president at Invesco after working as a financial advisor at Morgan Stanley. The head of global relationship management at Eaton Vance (Morgan Stanley) and then of retail sales at RidgeWorth Investments (Virtus), he subsequently became the head of Wealth Management Consulting Group at Cohen & Steers.</ref>

References

1971 births
American football defensive tackles
Green Bay Packers players
Living people
Navy Midshipmen football players
New England Patriots players
People from Delaware County, Pennsylvania
Players of American football from Pennsylvania
Sportspeople from Chester, Pennsylvania
Ridley High School alumni
Military personnel from Pennsylvania